Spotted flounder is a common name for several fishes and may refer to:

Ammotretis lituratus, native to the southern coast of Australia
Azygopus pinnifasciatus, native to Australia and New Zealand
Citharus linguatula, native to the eastern Atlantic Ocean and Mediterranean Sea
Hippoglossina bollmani, native to the eastern Pacific Ocean
Mancopsetta maculata, native to the Southern Ocean